Battista Giovanni Bardis (born 21 May 1987) is a French weightlifter, born in Paris. His personal best is 335 kg.

At the 2007 World Weightlifting Championships he ranked 26th in the 77 kg category, with a total of 325 kg.

At the 2008 European Weightlifting Championships he ranked fifth in the 77 kg category, with a total of 335 kg.

He competed in Weightlifting at the 2008 Summer Olympics in the 77 kg division finishing fourteenth with 329 kg.

Notes and references

External links
 
 
 
 
 
 

1987 births
Living people
French male weightlifters
Sportspeople from Paris
Weightlifters at the 2008 Summer Olympics
Weightlifters at the 2016 Summer Olympics
Olympic weightlifters of France
Mediterranean Games silver medalists for France
Mediterranean Games medalists in weightlifting
Competitors at the 2013 Mediterranean Games
21st-century French people